Keohwa, Ltd. was a Seoul, South Korea, based assembler of Jeeps under licence, mainly for export markets. Its predecessor was the Jeep assembly joint venture of Shinjin Motors and American Motor Corporation (AMC), established in 1974. It was spun off as an independent company in 1981, after AMC left the venture and retired the permission to use the Jeep trade mark. In 1983, Jeeps from Keohwa started to be named as "Korando"  In 1984, Keohwa was acquired by Dong-A Motor, the predecessor of Ssangyong Motor.

Models

Unlike Kia, who also produced Jeep vehicles, Keowha produced exact copies, plus its own variants of the following:
 CJ 5 & 6, later as the Korando
 M-5GA1 (South Korean-produced version of the Willys M38A1 MD jeep)
 M-715

Notes

See also
 Asia Motors, another South Korean jeep manufacturer
 List of Korean car makers

Vehicle manufacturing companies established in 1981
Vehicle manufacturing companies disestablished in 2011
Defunct motor vehicle manufacturers of South Korea
Car manufacturers of South Korea
Manufacturing companies based in Seoul
South Korean companies established in 1981